Don Chapman is an American architect, builder, and politician who is currently serving as a member of the South Carolina House of Representatives from the 6th district. Mitchell is a Republican.

Early life and career
Chapman was born in Japan. He attended Savannah College of Art and Design where he received a Bachelor's degree in interior design and a master's degree in architecture. In 1994, he founded his own architecture firm in Anderson, South Carolina.

Chapman serves on the House Rules and the Agriculture, Natural Resources and Environmental Affairs Committees.

Political career
In 2008, Chapman was elected to the city council of Anderson, South Carolina. He held the position for 14 years. He resigned in 2021 to run for state representative for South Carolina's 6th district. The incumbent at the time was Jonathon D. Hill, who was accused of multiple ethics violations. Hill withdrew from the primary race and Chapman won the nomination. In the 2022 general election, Chapman defeated the Democratic candidate with over 70% of the vote.

References

Republican Party members of the South Carolina House of Representatives
1966 births
Living people
Savannah College of Art and Design alumni
People from Anderson, South Carolina